Chromium(III) iodide, also known as chromium triiodide, is an inorganic compound with the formula CrI3.  It is a black solid that is used to prepare other chromium iodides.

Like the isomorphous  chromium(III) chloride (CrCl3), chromium(III) iodide exhibits a cubic-closest packing arrangement in a double-layer crystal lattice.  In this structure, chromium exhibits octahedral coordination geometry.

Preparation and properties
Chromium triiodide is prepared by the direct reaction of chromium metal with an excess of iodine. The reaction is conducted at 500 °C:
2 Cr  +  3 I2   →   2 CrI3

To obtain high purity samples, the product is thermally decomposed at 700 °C to sublime out chromium(II) iodide.  The diiodide is then reiodinated.

Chromium triiodide is stable in contact with oxygen and moisture, but at temperatures approaching 200 °C it reacts with oxygen and releases iodine. Like CrCl3, the triiodide exhibits slow solubility in water owing to the kinetic inertness of Cr(III).  Addition of small amounts of chromous iodide accelerates the dissolving process.

Chromium triiodide can also be prepared as nanoplatelets from the alkoxide Cr(OCMetBu2)3.

Chromium triiodide was one of the first materials which was discovered to be a magnetic two-dimensional material that has great potentials for spintronics devices.

References

Chromium(III) compounds
Iodides
Metal halides